Cleveland S. Harley Baseball Park is a baseball venue in Spartanburg, South Carolina. It is home to the USC Upstate Spartans baseball team of the NCAA's Division I Big South Conference. It opened on February 1, 2004, when Upstate swept a double header against Tusculum College. The facility has a capacity of 500 spectators.

The park is named for Cleveland S. Harley, a Spartanburg-area businessman and philanthropist. Harley played a role in both the university's founding and the development of its athletic programs. The venue also features a press box, practice facility, and batting cages. It is part of the Louis P. Howell Athletic Complex.

Spartan home records
The following is a list of USC Upstate Spartans home records since Harley Park's opening in 2004.  The Spartans moved from Division II to Division I in time for the beginning of the 2008 season.

See also
 List of NCAA Division I baseball venues

References

College baseball venues in the United States
Baseball venues in South Carolina
Sports venues in Spartanburg County, South Carolina
USC Upstate Spartans baseball
Buildings and structures in Spartanburg, South Carolina